Karl Kanhäuser, also known as Karel Kannhauser (18 July 1900 – 31 December 1945 (declared)) was a footballer who played international football for both Austria and Czechoslovakia. Kanhäuser played as a striker for Wiener Sport-Club and DFC Prag. His brother was fellow player Eduard Kanhäuser.

Personal life and death
Kanhauser renounced Austrian for Czechoslovakian citizenship in 1931.
Kanhauser continued to live in Prague with his family through the Second World War until in 1944 he was drafted in the Wehrmacht and deployed to Yugoslavia where he went missing in action. He was declared by the Vienna Regional Court to have died on 31 December 1945, five months on from his 45th birthday and seven months after the end of war in Europe.

References

1900 births
1945 deaths
Footballers from Vienna
Austrian footballers
Austria international footballers
Czechoslovak footballers
Czechoslovakia international footballers
Dual internationalists (football)
Wiener Sport-Club players
Association football forwards
DFC Prag players
German military personnel killed in World War II